Bungalow 2 is a novel by Danielle Steel, published by Delacorte Press in June 2007. The book is Steel's seventy-second novel.

Synopsis
Writer Tanya Harris loves her life as a mother and wife living in Marin County but has always wanted the chance to write a major Hollywood screenplay. When the chance arises, although initially turning it down, her husband encourages her to take the once-in-a-lifetime offer.

Working in Hollywood with the Oscar-winning producer Douglas Wayne is intoxicating for Tanya, especially when he sets his sights on her. Struggling to cope with the movie and her family, Tanya feels her family need her less and so as one opportunity after another leads her away from her old life and into this new world, Tanya finds life has many twists and turns whilst at Bungalow 2.

Footnotes
http://www.randomhouse.com/features/steel/bookshelf/display.pperl?isbn=9780385338318

2007 American novels
American romance novels
Novels by Danielle Steel
Delacorte Press books